Bings Heath is a small village in Shropshire, England.

It lies on the A53 near to the village of Astley. It is in the parish of Astley, north of Shrewsbury.

External links

Villages in Shropshire